"Here I Go" is a song by former singer/songwriter of Pink Floyd, Syd Barrett and is the sixth track on his first solo album, The Madcap Laughs.

The song tells the story in which the narrator's girlfriend leaves him because "a big band is far better" than himself. He attempts to win her back by writing her a song, but when he goes to her house to show it to her, he instead finds himself falling in love with her sister.

Recording
During the recording sessions for The Madcap Laughs, for the session on 17 April 1969, Barrett brought in fellow musicians Jerry Shirley, drummer with Humble Pie, and Willie Wilson, Jokers Wild's drummer, although for this occasion he was playing bass. Working in Abbey Road Studio 2, the musicians recorded "No Man's Land" together, then they recorded a song Barrett had written in a few minutes, "Here I Go" – the song required no overdubs of any kind. The session for these two songs only lasted three hours.

About 40 years later, for release on An Introduction to Syd Barrett, David Gilmour added bass to one track, "Here I Go".

Personnel
Syd Barrett – vocals, electric guitar

With:
Willie Wilson – drums
David Gilmour – bass (re-release on An Introduction to Syd Barrett)

References

Syd Barrett songs
Songs written by Syd Barrett
Experimental rock songs
1970 songs